KPAY-FM (93.9 MHz) is a commercial radio station located in Chico, California. KPAY-FM airs a news/talk format.

On August 1, 2019, the then-KFMF changed their format from mainstream rock to a simulcast of news/talk-formatted KPAY 1290 AM Chico. The station changed its call sign to KPAY-FM on August 16, 2019.  (KPAY-AM is now a Fox Sports Radio affiliate only.)

Notable Personalities and Shows
The Local Morning News with Scott Michaels, Mike Baca and Anthony Watts 
John Trout
The Clay Travis and Buck Sexton Show
Sean Hannity
Lars Larson
Mark Levin
Coast to Coast AM with George Noory

Previous logo

References

External links

Interview with Beau Phillips

PAY-FM
Radio stations established in 1969
1969 establishments in California
News and talk radio stations in the United States